The Toxic Avenger Part II is a 1989 American superhero black comedy film released by Troma Entertainment. It is the second installment of The Toxic Avenger franchise. It was directed by Lloyd Kaufman and features The Toxic Avenger in an adventure to Japan to meet his father. Devilman and Cutie Honey creator Go Nagai makes a cameo appearance. The film is also the debut of actor/martial artist Michael Jai White and musician/composer/performance artist Phoebe Legere.

Plot
Melvin Junko has been transformed into the superhero known as the Toxic Avenger. He has made Tromaville a safe place again. His blind girlfriend Claire gets him a job at the Tromaville Center for the Blind.

Apocalypse Inc., a New York-based chemical company, finds Tromaville to be the perfect home for its new takeover site, and has an employee disguised as a PUS deliveryman deliver a bomb into the center. Claire escapes upon learning of the bomb, but everyone else is killed. When the deliveryman and an Apocalypse construction worker arrive to begin their takeover, the Toxic Avenger emerges from the rubble and kills them. This leads to an all-out assault by members of Apocalypse Inc. Toxie defeats the thugs. Displeased, the Chairman orders his number one Mona Malfaire to call a meeting with the board of directors and fire the entire personnel department.

Apocalypse Inc. discover Toxie's father had left him and his mother when he was a baby. Using one of their "bad girls" as Toxie's psychologist, they convince Toxie to go to Japan to look for his father even though he has reservations about leaving Claire. Claire tells Toxie to go find his father. Toxie heads to Japan using a windsurfboard and a paper, asking for his father from the worker at a local Japanese restaurant. However, forgetting his passport, he enters Tokyo Godzilla-style, shocking a group of beachgoers. He runs into Masami, who is at first shocked, but befriends him after he saves her from some thugs. She offers to help him find his father.

Apocalypse Inc. takes advantage of Toxie's absence and begins a hostile takeover of Tromaville. People who stand up against them are beaten or killed.

Masami and Toxie find Big Mac Junko, a Japanese man. Toxie is elated until Masami sees a shipment of fish dropped on the floor and discovers cocaine in the fish. Big Mac is a Yakuza leader who delves in drug dealing. Toxie goes through a series of battles against Yakuza enforcers and Kabuki warriors. Using the environment to his advantage, Toxie defeats the entire gang, only leaving him and his father. Big Mac reveals to Toxie a bottle of "anti-Tromatons", which can kill Toxie. Toxie kicks the bottle out of his father's hand and pushes him to a fish butcher, who, excited by the action, kills Toxie's dad by chopping him up. The bottle breaks and Toxie begins to weaken. Masami takes Toxie to a sumo gym, where he is healed and begins training in the art of sumo before saying goodbye to Masami and heading back to Tromaville.

He learns that Malfaire and the "bad girls" are assaulting Claire. He takes on the bad girls while Claire gets the upper hand on Malfaire, incapacitating her. The Chairman hires a motorcycle rider named Dark Rider to destroy Tromaville. With nitroglycerin strapped to Dark Rider's back, the plan is for the Dark Rider to burst into City Hall. Toxie hijacks a taxi and after a series of turns and misses, ends up crashing. Toxie hijacks a hovercraft and drives it after the Dark Rider, forcing him to bust into a home, causing the Dark Rider's demise.

The people of Tromaville are elated. A man arrives in Tromaville and is revealed to be Melvin's real father. The Yakuza leader he defeated in Japan was "Bic Mac Bunko", who is glad to be reunited with both Melvin and his mom and is happy that Bunko, who had used identity theft against him, is no more. The Chairman and Malfaire unsuccessfully attempt to hitch a ride back to New York.

Cast
 John Altamura as The Toxic Avenger / Melvin Junko, a former janitor that was mutated into a deformed superhero. He previously had the last name Ferd in the last film.
 Ron Fazio as The Toxic Avenger (voice)
 Ron Fazio also portrays an Apocalypse Inc. Executive
 Phoebe Legere as Claire, the blind girlfriend of the Toxic Avenger. She was previously called Sara in the last film.
 Rick Collins as Apocalypse Inc. Chairman, the head of Apocalypse Inc.
 Lisa Gaye as Mona Malfaire, the right-hand woman of the Apocalypse Inc. Chairman.
 Rikiya Yasuoka (Michael Herz, uncredited voice) as Big Mac Bunko, a Yakuza leader who is supposedly Melvin's real father.
 Mayako Katsuragi (Patricia Kaufman, uncredited voice) as Masumi
 Tsutomu Sekine as Newscaster
 Jessica Dublin as Mrs. Junko, the mother of Melvin.
 Jack Cooper as Big Mac Junko, the estranged father of Melvin Junko.
 Don Eckhart as Kid riding bike in opening scene
 Fernando Antonio as Apocalypse Inc. Executive
 Paul Borghese as Lou Sipher: Apocalypse Inc. Executive
 Sylvester Covin as Apocalypse Inc. Executive
 William Decker as Apocalypse Inc. Executive
 Joe Fleishaker as Apocalypse Inc. Executive
 Mark Fucile as Apocalypse Inc. Executive
 Marc Allan Ginsberg as Apocalypse Inc. Executive
 Sal Lioni as Apocalypse Inc. Executive
 Doug McDonald as Apocalypse Inc. Executive
 Benny Nieves as Apocalypse Inc. Executive
 Kariim Ratcliff as Apocalypse Inc. Executive
 Michael Jai White as Apocalypse Inc. Executive
 Susan Whitty as Apocalypse Inc. Executive
 Jeremiah Yates as Apocalypse Inc. Executive
 Dan Snow as Cigar Face, a gangster and old enemy of Toxie who allies with Apocalypse Inc.
 Scott Leva as the Dark Rider (uncredited)
 Lloyd Kaufman (uncredited) as Sumo wrestler / Voice of fish salesman

Production
When production started, John Altamura played The Toxic Avenger with Ron Fazio doing some doubling mainly for long shots of the character, as he was already cast as an Apocalypse Inc. executive. However, according to a 2001 interview with Fazio, Altamura abused his authority by complaining about the make-up and had threatened some staff members, pushing Kaufman to fire Altamura. Kaufman then hired Fazio to play the Toxic Avenger when production moved to Tokyo, Japan. However, Kaufman kept the scenes with Altamura in the film, hence in the film's opening fight sequence, it is seen that both Fazio and Altamura face against each other with Fazio playing the tiger-striped member of Apocalypse Inc who gets punched Exorcist-style by Altamura's Toxic Avenger. Fazio's voice would be used as the Toxic Avenger.

In addition to Tokyo, filming locations included New York City and New Jersey. Michael Jai White made his film debut in the film and not only acted as a member of Apocalypse Inc., but assisted with the film's fight sequences in New York while Hitoshi Genma coordinated the film's action scenes in Japan.

Lloyd Kaufman was told that the main Japanese actors, Rikiya Yasuoka and Mayako Katsuragi, spoke English. However, upon his shooting the scenes, he learned that Yasuoka and Katsuragi's English was not good enough. During post-production, Lloyd hired his wife Patricia, who also appears in the film as the "blind mother" and at the time, was the New York City Film Commissioner, to dub Katsuragi's voice. Co-creator/producer Michael Herz dubbed Yasuoka's voice.

Home media
The 'Unrated Director's cut' version released on DVD by Troma Entertainment is missing almost all scenes of gore. A version with an extra 10 minutes of gore was released in the 'Tox Box' DVD set.

The Japanese and German releases are the full uncut version.

The 2008 'Complete Toxic Avenger' 7-disc DVD set includes the uncut version and is the same disc found in the 'Tox Box'.

88 Films released the film in 98kb in November 2014 on Blu-ray. The US release of Blu-ray Disc was in High Definition.

Reception

Critical response
As of 2022, The Toxic Avenger Part II holds a 0% rating on Rotten Tomatoes based on six reviews.

References

External links
 
 
 
 

The Toxic Avenger (franchise)
1989 films
1980s comedy horror films
1980s superhero films
American superhero films
1989 comedy films
1989 horror films
American comedy horror films
American splatter films
1980s Japanese-language films
Films directed by Lloyd Kaufman
American sequel films
Troma Entertainment films

Films set in New Jersey
Films set in Tokyo
Films shot in Tokyo
Films shot in New Jersey
Films shot in New York City
Superhero horror films
Japan in non-Japanese culture
Yakuza films
1980s English-language films
1980s American films
1980s Japanese films